Michael L. Maguire (born February 20, 1955) is a retired American actor, best known for his role as Enjolras in the original Broadway production of the musical Les Misérables. This role won him a Tony Award in 1987. It also won him a Drama Desk Award and a Theatre World Award. In 1995 he was chosen to reprise the role in Les Misérables: The Dream Cast in Concert at the Royal Albert Hall in London, produced to celebrate the musical's 10th anniversary. His voice type is baritone.

Maguire was born in Newport News, Virginia, and, as a teenager, worked as a strolling troubadour in Williamsburg, Virginia, before going on to study opera at the Oberlin Conservatory and the University of Michigan. He worked as a stockbroker for several years before making his Broadway debut in 1987 with Les Misérables. He appeared in the films L.A. Pictures, Cadillac, Go Fish, The Deep End of the Ocean, Busted, and Where The Day Takes You, as well as in a variety of television shows.

In 2008 he received a law degree from Southwestern Law School in Los Angeles.  He now practices family law in Beverly Hills.

External links
 
 
 
 Michael L Maguire & Associates

References

1955 births
Living people
American male film actors
American male musical theatre actors
American male television actors
Drama Desk Award winners
Stockbrokers
Theatre World Award winners
Tony Award winners
University of Michigan School of Music, Theatre & Dance alumni